Eskilson Historic District is a national historic district located at Gary, Indiana.  The district encompasses 97 contributing buildings in an exclusively residential section of Gary. They were built during the 1920s and 1930s, and include examples of Colonial Revival, Tudor Revival, Mission Revival, and Bungalow / American Craftsman architecture.

It was listed in the National Register of Historic Places in 2014.

References

Historic districts on the National Register of Historic Places in Indiana
Houses on the National Register of Historic Places in Indiana
Colonial Revival architecture in Indiana
Tudor Revival architecture in Indiana
Mission Revival architecture in Indiana
Historic districts in Gary, Indiana
National Register of Historic Places in Gary, Indiana